Villa Costanza, otherwise known as Villa Saibante, Monga, is a Venetian villa dating back to the first half of the seventeenth century. It is located in the municipality of San Pietro in Cariano, in Valpolicella, in the province of Verona. It borders on Pullè villa.

The construction of the building can be dated between 1623 and 1629. The shape is of inverted "U" with a central body and two perpendicular wings. The west wing housed the stables and the east wing is decorated with different military-decorations. Inside we can find numerous and valuable frescoes.

Notes

Bibliography 

 
 
 

Buildings and structures in the Province of Verona